Jamesburgh may refer to:
Jamesburgh, California, former name of Jamesburg, California
Jamesburgh, New York, former name of Walker Valley, New York